Alucita nannodactyla is a species of moth of the family Alucitidae. It is known from Socotra, Yemen.

References

Alucitidae
Fauna of Socotra
Moths described in 1907
Moths of the Middle East
Taxa named by Hans Rebel